Hall of Fame is an album by pianist/bandleader Count Basie and His Orchestra recorded in 1956 and first released on the Verve label in 1959.

Reception

AllMusic awarded the album 3 stars.

Track listing
 "Blues Inside Out" (Ernie Wilkins) - 6:37
 "Big Red" (Wilkins) - 3:50
 "Trick or Treat" (Wilkins) - 4:15
 "Lady in Lace" (Frank Foster) - 4:37
 "Flute Juice" (Wilkins) - 3:09
 "Lollypop" (Neal Hefti) - 3:10
 "Slats" (Wilkins) - 4:44
 "Move" (Denzil Best) - 3:28
 "Dolphin Bip" (Reunald Jones) - 3:14
 "Stompin' and Jumpin'" (Wilkins) - 2:49 
 "Low Life" (Johnny Mandel) - 5:09
Recorded at Fine Sound in New York City on January 5, 1956 (track 2),  January 11, 1956 (tracks 1, 3-5 & 8–10), June 26, 1956 (tracks 7 & 11) and June 27, 1956 (track 6)

Personnel 
Count Basie - piano
Wendell Culley, Reunald Jones, Thad Jones, Joe Newman - trumpet
Henry Coker, Bill Hughes, Benny Powell - trombone
Marshall Royal - alto saxophone, clarinet
Bill Graham - alto saxophone
Frank Wess - alto saxophone, tenor saxophone, flute, clarinet
Frank Foster - tenor saxophone, clarinet
Charlie Fowlkes - baritone saxophone, bass clarinet
Freddie Green - guitar 
Eddie Jones - bass
Sonny Payne - drums
Neal Hefti (track 6), Frank Foster (track 4), Johnny Mandel (track 11), Frank Wess (track 8), Ernie Wilkins (tracks 1–3, 5, 7, 9  10) - arranger

References 

1959 albums
Count Basie Orchestra albums
Verve Records albums
Albums arranged by Ernie Wilkins
Albums arranged by Frank Foster (musician)
Albums arranged by Neal Hefti
Albums arranged by Johnny Mandel
Albums produced by Norman Granz